Tsotne is a Georgian masculine given name. Notable figures with this name include:
Tsotne Bakuria (born 1971), Georgian politician 
Tsotne Dadiani (died c. 1260), Georgian nobleman 
Tsotne Machavariani (born 1997), Georgian sport shooter 
Tsotne Rogava (born 1993), Ukrainian Muay Thai kickboxer

Georgian masculine given names